The Utah Republican Party is the affiliate of the Republican Party in the U.S. state of Utah. It is currently the dominant party in the state, controlling all four of Utah's U.S. House seats, both U.S. Senate seats, the governorship, and has supermajorities in both houses of the state legislature.

History
The state of Utah politics was reorganized after the 1890 Manifesto led by Wilford Woodruff.  The 1890 Manifesto officially ended the traditionally Mormon practice of Polygamy.  Many prominent polygamist Mormons were imprisoned, punished and harassed since the 1890 Manifesto prohibited plural marriage.  This action granted the Utah Territory statehood in 1896 on the condition that polygamy was banned in the state constitution. The Republican Frank J. Cannon was the first delegate elected to congress by the state of Utah in 1894.

Although Utah was generally considered a Democratic-leaning area (or an area that would lean Democratic) before statehood, the state of Utah rapidly gained overwhelming support for the Republican Party after 1896. Although the Republican Party had been strongly opposed to polygamy since its inception and had played a major part in abolishing polygamy, the Republican U.S. Senator Reed Smoot rose to political power. Smoot led a political alliance of Mormons and non-Mormons that created a strong Republican party in many parts of the state.

The Republican Party is currently dominant in Utah politics: no Democrat has won statewide office since 1996, when Jan Graham was elected attorney general; and when Mia Love replaced Jim Matheson in congress in 2014, Utah's congressional delegation became all-Republican. When Love lost her seat to Ben McAdams in the 2018 election, Democrats regained one of Utah's four seats. After the 2020 election Ben McAdams lost his seat to Burgess Owens and Utah’s congressional delegation became all-Republican again.

Current elected officials
The Utah Republican Party controls all five statewide offices and holds a supermajority in the Utah House of Representatives and the Utah State Senate. Republicans also hold both of the state's U.S. Senate seats and all four of the state's U.S. House seats.

Members of Congress

U.S. Senate

U.S. House of Representatives
UT-1st: Blake Moore
UT-2nd: Chris Stewart
UT-3rd: John Curtis
UT-4th: Burgess Owens

Statewide offices
Governor: Spencer Cox
Lieutenant Governor: Deidre Henderson
Attorney General: Sean Reyes
State Treasurer: Marlo Oaks
State Auditor: John Dougall

State Legislature
President of the Senate: J. Stuart Adams
Senate Majority Leader: Evan Vickers
Speaker of the House: Brad Wilson
House Majority Leader: Francis D. Gibson

State party organization

In off-election years the Utah Republican Party holds organizing conventions where state delegate elect a chair, vice-chair, secretary and treasurer.  The state party officers are elected for a term of two (2) years.

Central Committee
The State Central Committee (SCC) has representatives from every county in Utah.  Along with the automatic members, each county chair and vice-chair, counties are allocated representative based on the number of voting republicans in that county.  These representatives are chosen in elections which take place in the Republican county conventions held in odd-numbered years.

Election results

Presidential

Gubernatorial

Right of Association Legal Appeal

The State Central Committee (SCC) is the governing body of the party.  In 2014 the state legislature passed SB54 which created a pathway by which candidates from all parties in Utah could bypass the nominating conventions and qualify directly for the primary ballot by collecting a required number of signatures.

SB54 forced the parties in Utah to have open primaries, among other demands.  The SCC directed its party chairman, James Evans, to file a lawsuit, which sought, among other things, to overturn the use of open primaries.  The Utah Republican Party prevailed on this point, which required the state elections office to defer to the Utah Republican Party as to whether the primary would be open or closed and whether unaffiliated voters would be eligible to sign ballot-access petitions for Republican candidates.

The party filed two more lawsuits to try to overturn SB54's signature path to the ballot, but lost those cases.  They appealed to the 10th Circuit Court which upheld the lower courts ruling and a subsequent appeal to the US Supreme Court was denied.

State Party Caucuses
Party Caucuses are held every two years in Utah.

County party organizations

Each of Utah's 29 counties has a party organization, which operates within that county and sends delegates to the State Central Committee.

See also
Republican Party
Democratic Party of Utah
Libertarian Party of Utah

References

External links

Utah Republican Party
Utah County Republican Party
Davis County Republican Party
Cache County Republican Party
Utah Republican Veterans Caucus
Utah Federation of College Republicans
Utah Teen Aged Republicans
Republican State Leadership Committee
Utah Black Republican Assembly

Republican Party
Republican Party (United States) by state